Lago di Santa Giustina is a lake in Trentino, Italy.

Lakes of Trentino-Alto Adige/Südtirol
Nonsberg Group